

1788 and 1789 elections 

These were the first Senate elections, which coincided with the election of President George Washington. As of this election, formal organized political parties had yet to form in the United States, but two political factions were present: The coalition of senators who supported George Washington's administration were known as "Pro-Administration," and the senators against him as "Anti-Administration." Members are informally grouped into factions of similar interest, based on an analysis of their voting record.

1790 and 1791 elections 

These were the second series of elections. In these elections, terms were up for the nine Senators in Class 1.  As of these elections, formal organized political parties had yet to form in the United States, but two political factions were present: The coalition of Senators who supported President George Washington's administration were known as the Pro-Administration Party, and the Senators against him as the Anti-Administration Party.

Note: There were no political parties in this Congress. Members are informally grouped into factions of similar interest, based on an analysis of their voting record.

1792 and 1793 elections 

These elections coincided with President George Washington's unanimous re-election.  In these elections, terms were up for the ten senators in class 2.

Note: There were no political parties in this Congress. Members are informally grouped into factions of similar interest, based on an analysis of their voting record.

1794 and 1795 elections 

These elections had the formation of organized political parties in the United States, with the Federalist Party emerging from the Pro Administration coalition, and the Democratic-Republican Party emerging from the Anti-Administration coalition.

1796 and 1797 elections 

These elections coincided with John Adams's election as President.  His ruling Federalist Party gained one seat.

1798 and 1799 elections 

These elections were held at the middle of President John Adams's administration and had no net change in political control of the Senate.

1800 and 1801 elections 

Coinciding with their takeover of the White House, the Democratic-Republicans took control of the Senate.  Although the Federalists began the next (7th) Congress with a slim majority, they lost their majority shortly thereafter due to mid-year special elections.

1802 and 1803 elections 
These elections had the Democratic-Republicans assume an overwhelming control of the Senate.

1804 and 1805 elections 

These elections expanded the Democratic-Republicans' overwhelming control of the Senate. The Federalists went into the elections with such a small share of seats (9 out of 34, or 26%) that even had they won every election, they would have still remained a minority caucus.

1806 and 1807 elections

1808 and 1809 elections

1810 and 1811 elections 

The Democratic-Republicans held their majority unchanged. The minority Federalists had gone into the elections with such a small share of Senate seats (8 out of 34, or 23.5%) that they had won all of the elections, they would still not have controlled a majority.

1812 and 1813 elections 

Coinciding with President James Madison's re-election, the Democratic-Republican Party lost two seats but still retained an overwhelming majority in the Senate. As in recent elections, the minority Federalists had gone into the elections with such a small share of Senate seats that if they had won every one of the elections, they would still not have controlled a majority.

1814 and 1815 elections 

The Democratic-Republicans lost a seat but still retained an overwhelming majority in the Senate.  Unlike in recent elections, the minority Federalists had gone into the elections with a change of regaining their long-lost majority had they swept almost all the seats.  However, only one seat switched parties.  Two seats held by Democratic-Republicans were left unfilled until long after the next Congress began.

1816 and 1817 elections

1818 and 1819 elections

1820 and 1821 elections

1822 and 1823 elections

1824 and 1825 elections 

The elections of 1824 and 1825 saw the Jacksonians gain a majority over the Anti-Jacksonians (sometimes called the "National Republican Party").

1826 and 1827 elections

1828 and 1829 elections

1830 and 1831 elections

1832 and 1833 elections

1834 and 1835 elections

1836 and 1837 elections

1838 and 1839 elections

1840 and 1841 elections

1842 and 1843 elections

1844 and 1845 elections

1846 and 1847 elections

1848 and 1849 elections

1850 and 1851 elections

1852 and 1853 elections

1854 and 1855 elections

1856 and 1857 elections 

The young Republican Party assumed its position as one of the United States's two main political parties.  The Whigs and Free Soilers were gone by the time the next Congress began.

1858 and 1859 elections

1860 and 1861 elections

1862 and 1863 elections

1864 and 1865 elections 

These elections, corresponding with Abraham Lincoln's re-election as president, saw the Republicans gain two seats. As these elections occurred during the Civil War, most of the Southern states were absent.

1866 and 1867 elections

1868 and 1869 elections

1870 and 1871 elections

1872 and 1873 elections

1874 and 1875 elections

1876 and 1877 elections

1878 and 1879 elections

1880 and 1881 elections

1882 and 1883 elections

1884 and 1885 elections

1886 and 1887 elections

1888 and 1889 elections 

These elections coincided with Benjamin Harrison's victory over incumbent President Grover Cleveland.  Both parties were unchanged in the general elections, but later special elections would give Republicans an eight-seat majority, mostly from newly admitted states.

1890 and 1891 elections

1892 and 1893 elections

1894 and 1895 elections

1896 and 1897 elections

1898 and 1899 elections

1900 and 1901 elections

1902 and 1903 elections

1904 and 1905 elections

1906 and 1907 elections

1908 and 1909 elections

1910 and 1911 elections 

Although the 17th Amendment was not passed until 1913, some states elected their Senators directly before its passage. Oregon pioneered direct election and experimented with different measures over several years until it succeeded in 1907. Soon after, Nebraska followed suit and laid the foundation for other states to adopt measures reflecting the people's will. By 1912, as many as 29 states elected senators either as nominees of their party's primary or in conjunction with a general election.

1912 and 1913 elections

See also elections 
 List of elections in the United States

References